The Vietnam National Academy of Music, formerly the Hanoi Conservatory of Music, is the major classical and traditional music teaching institution in Vietnam.

History
Originally established in 1956 as the Vietnam School of Music (Trường Âm nhạc Việt Nam) and conferred university status in 1982, the Conservatory is Vietnam’s premier music training, research and performance institute. On 27 February 2008, the Hanoi Conservatory of Music changed its name to the Vietnam National Academy of Music (VNAM).

Academic activity
It offers eleven-year Secondary Certificate programmes and four-year Bachelor of Music programmes, plus two-year Master of Music programmes and Doctoral research. The Conservatory currently has over 1,000 students at various levels. The majority of its 200-plus teaching staff (which include 17 Nghệ sĩ Ưu tú or Excellent Artists) are graduates of overseas conservatories in the former Soviet Union, Western Europe, North America and Japan. To date the institution has trained over 7,500 students, including overseas students from Russia, France, Japan, Germany, China, the United States, Cambodia and Laos.

The Academy also functions as an important music performance centre, staging numerous concerts throughout the year in the Hanoi Conservatory of Music Concert Hall. It also participates in many exchange programmes with overseas conservatories, sending its musical ensembles abroad to perform and teach and in turn hosting performance and teaching visits by many internationally acclaimed orchestras and soloists.

The Vietnam National Academy of Music now has over 1500 students according to Rector Ngo Van Thanh who has recently replaced Dr Tran Thu Ha as the head of this fine musical university.

Hanoi Philharmonic Orchestra
In addition to teaching, the Conservatory is the source of the Hanoi Philharmonic Orchestra, made up of faculty, talented students and other professional musicians. The group regularly performs at the Nhà Hát Lớn (Hanoi Opera House). Many of its members go on to play for the VNSO.

References

External links
 Official Site
 Vietnam Cultural Profiles

Music schools in Vietnam
Universities in Hanoi
Educational institutions established in 1956
1956 establishments in Vietnam